James K. Baker and his wife Janet M. Baker are the co-founders of Dragon Systems.  Together they are credited with the creation of Dragon NaturallySpeaking.

James Baker is an expert in speech recognition technology and  a Distinguished Career Professor at Carnegie Mellon University.

From June 2007 to 2009, Baker served as director of research at the  Center of Excellence in Human Language at the Johns Hopkins University.

Biography
Baker is a 1963 graduate of Yorktown High School (Arlington County, Virginia).

Publications

References

External links
 James Baker's webpage, Carnegie Mellon University

Living people
Carnegie Mellon University faculty
Year of birth missing (living people)
Place of birth missing (living people)
Carnegie Mellon University alumni
Speech processing researchers
Princeton University alumni
Yorktown High School (Virginia) alumni